The United Nations Educational, Scientific and Cultural Organization (UNESCO) World Heritage Sites are places of importance to cultural or natural heritage as described in the UNESCO World Heritage Convention, established in 1972. Cultural heritage consists of monuments (such as architectural works, monumental sculptures, or inscriptions), groups of buildings, and sites (including archaeological sites). Natural features (consisting of physical and biological formations), geological and physiographical formations (including habitats of threatened species of animals and plants), and natural sites which are important from the point of view of science, conservation or natural beauty, are defined as natural heritage. Italy ratified the convention on June 23, 1978.

, Italy has 58 listed sites, making it the state party with the most World Heritage Sites, just above China (56). The first site in Italy, the Rock Drawings in Valcamonica, was listed at the 3rd Session of the World Heritage Committee, held in Cairo and Luxor, Egypt, in 1979. Twenty-five Italian sites were added during the 1990s, including 10 sites added at the 21st session held in Naples in 1997. Italy has served as a member of the World Heritage Committee five times, 1978–1985, 1987–1993, 1993–1999, 1999–2001, and 2021–2025.

Out of Italy's 58 heritage sites, 53 are cultural and 5 are natural. Seven sites are transnational. The Historic Centre of Rome is shared with the Vatican; the Monte San Giorgio and Rhaetian Railway  with Switzerland; the Venetian Works of Defence with Croatia and Montenegro; the Prehistoric pile dwellings around the Alps with 5 other countries; The Great Spa Towns of Europe with 6 other countries; and the Ancient and Primeval Beech Forests of the Carpathians and Other Regions of Europe are shared with 17 other countries. In addition, Italy has 31 sites on the tentative list.



World Heritage Sites
UNESCO lists sites under ten criteria; each entry must meet at least one of the criteria. Criteria i through vi are cultural, and vii through x are natural.

Tentative list
In addition to the sites inscribed on the World Heritage List, member states can maintain a list of tentative sites that they may consider for nomination. Nominations for the World Heritage List are only accepted if the site has previously been listed on the tentative list. , Italy recorded 31 tentative sites.

See also
 Tourism in Italy

References

 
Italy
World Heritage Sites
World Heritage Sites